Daniel Jason Sudeikis (born September 18, 1975) is an American actor, comedian, writer, and producer. In the 1990s, he began his career in improv comedy and performed with ComedySportz, iO Chicago (Improv Olympic), and The Second City. In 2003, Sudeikis was hired as a writer for the NBC sketch comedy series Saturday Night Live, and later spent nine seasons as a cast member from 2005 to 2013, playing Joe Biden and Mitt Romney, among others.

In 2020, he co-created and began starring as the lead in the Apple TV+ sports comedy series Ted Lasso, which earned him four nominations at the Primetime Emmy Awards, including wins for Outstanding Comedy Series and Outstanding Lead Actor in a Comedy Series, two wins for the Golden Globe Award for Best Actor in a TV Comedy Series in 2021 and 2022 and for the Screen Actors Guild Award for Outstanding Actor in a Comedy Series. Sudeikis has also acted in recurring roles in the comedy series 30 Rock (2007–2010), It's Always Sunny in Philadelphia (2010–2011), Portlandia (2011–2014), and The Last Man on Earth (2015–2018).

He had leading film roles in the comedies Horrible Bosses (2011) and its 2014 sequel, Horrible Bosses 2 (2014), and We're the Millers (2013), as well as the acclaimed independent films Drinking Buddies (2013), Sleeping with Other People (2015), and Colossal (2016); and supporting roles in Alexander Payne's Downsizing (2017) and Olivia Wilde's Booksmart (2019). He has also provided voice-work for Epic (2013), The Angry Birds Movie (2016), its 2019 sequel, and Next Gen (2018).

Early life
Daniel Jason Sudeikis was born on September 18, 1975, in Fairfax, Virginia, to Kathryn Sudeikis (née Wendt), a travel agent at Brennco and President of the American Society of Travel Agents, and Daniel Joseph Sudeikis, a vice president of business development, both originally from Illinois. He has two younger sisters, Kristin and Lindsay. His father is of Irish and Lithuanian descent, while his mother has German and Irish ancestry. His maternal uncle is actor George Wendt, known for his role as Norm Peterson on Cheers, and his matrilineal great-grandfather was photographer Tom Howard.

Sudeikis was born with anosmia, leaving him with no sense of smell.

Sudeikis moved with his family to Overland Park within Johnson County, Kansas; which he has described as his hometown. He graduated from Shawnee Mission West High School and attended Fort Scott Community College on a basketball scholarship, but left before finishing.

Career

Career beginnings
In the 1990s, Sudeikis began his career in improv comedy. He began performing at ComedySportz (now called Comedy City) in Kansas City, Missouri. He moved to Chicago, Illinois, where he studied at the Annoyance Theatre and IO Theater (formerly known as ImprovOlympic) and was one of the founding members of the long form team, J.T.S. Brown. He performed with Boom Chicago in Amsterdam, Netherlands.

Sudeikis was later cast in The Second City Touring Company. In the early 2000s, he became a founding member of The Second City Las Vegas, where he performed at the Flamingo.

Saturday Night Live
In 2003, while a regular performer at The Second City Las Vegas, Sudeikis was hired as a sketch writer for Saturday Night Live (SNL), and would occasionally make bit appearances as audience members or extras. In May 2005, he became a featured player on the show, and was upgraded to repertory status at the beginning of the show's 32nd season on September 30, 2006. In July 2013, Sudeikis announced that he was leaving SNL. In 2015, 2016, and 2019 he made occasional appearances on the show. On October 23, 2021, Sudeikis made his hosting debut with musical guest Brandi Carlile.

Recurring characters

 George W. Bush, 43rd president of the United States.
 Joe Biden, 47th vice president of the United States and 46th president of the United States.
 Mitt Romney, 70th governor of Massachusetts and 2012 Republican Party nominee for president of the United States
 Male A-hole of the Two A-Holes with actress Kristen Wiig
 Ocean Billy, a parody of the 1980s singer Billy Ocean and his hit "Get Outta My Dreams, Get Into My Car"
 One half of the Bon Jovi "opposite band" Jon Bovi, appearing on Weekend Update (with Will Forte) 
 Gil, a news anchor who treats his field correspondent Michelle Dison's (Kristen Wiig) misfortunes as amusement
 One of the guys from the "Song Memories" sketches who is the first to tell strange stories about where he was when he first heard a song
 Ed Mahoney, a brash man who often makes a fool of himself in public
 Officer Sikorsky, a police officer who brings in convict Lorenzo McIntosh (Kenan Thompson) in an attempt to "scare straight" the three delinquent teens (Bill Hader, Bobby Moynihan, Andy Samberg, and occasionally the week's guest host) that he often arrests
 Vance on "What Up with That?", an overzealous background dancer often dressed in an Adidas tracksuit with a 1980s man perm
 DJ Supersoak, spoof on DJ Clay
 Pete Twinkle, ESPN Classic host of obscure women's sports with dim-witted Greg Stink (Will Forte) as his co-host
 Jeff, a disgruntled film and theatre technician who starts unprovoked arguments with the star of the piece
 The Devil, who often comes on Weekend Update to point out religious and moral hypocrisy on Earth
 Jack Rizzoli, an anchor at WXPD News who always tells veteran reporter Herb Welch (Bill Hader) to do his job
 Tommy, a strip club M.C. for Bongo's Clown Room
 Sensei Mark Hoffman, the faculty adviser and Japanese Studies teacher to Jonathan Cavanaugh-san and Rebecca Stern-Markowitz-san (Taran Killam and Vanessa Bayer, respectively), hosts of "J-Pop America Fun Time Now"
 Marshall T. Boudreaux, host of the courtroom reality show Maine Justice

Film, television and other work

Early work
Sudeikis had a recurring role on the series 30 Rock (2007–2010), appearing in a total of 12 episodes. He played Floyd DeBarber, a love interest of Tina Fey's character Liz Lemon. Sudeikis last appeared in four episodes towards the end of the show's fourth season in 2010.

He began his film career with supporting roles in Watching the Detectives (2007), The Ten (2007), Meet Bill (2007), What Happens in Vegas (2008) and The Rocker (2008). He did voice work for the videogame Grand Theft Auto IV (2008), playing the role of right-wing radio host Richard Bastion.

In July 2008, Sudeikis co-starred with Bill Hader and Joe Lo Truglio in the web series The Line on Crackle.

He had supporting roles in the movies The Bounty Hunter (2010) and Going the Distance (2010). On August 16, 2010, Sudeikis co-hosted WWE Raw with Going the Distance co-stars Charlie Day and Justin Long at the Staples Center in Los Angeles.

Sudeikis was a voice actor on the animated-comedy series The Cleveland Show (2009–2013). He provided the voices for Holt Richter, Cleveland's wannabe hipster neighbor, and Terry Kimple, Cleveland's hard-partying high school buddy, who now works with Cleveland at the cable company. After being credited as a recurring guest in season one, Sudeikis was bumped up to a series regular beginning in season two.

Film breakthrough
In May 2010, Sudeikis joined the cast of the Seth Gordon comedy film Horrible Bosses (2011). He had worked with Day when he played the role of Schmitty on It's Always Sunny in Philadelphia and reprised the role on that show's 7th-season finale. Sudeikis played his first lead film role in the Farrelly brothers comedy Hall Pass (2011). 
 
He hosted the 2011 MTV Movie Awards on June 5, 2011, at the Gibson Amphitheatre in Los Angeles

Sudeikis became the voice for a line of advertisements of Applebee's that began running in 2012. Sudeikis made appearances in six episodes on the series Eastbound & Down (2012–2013). He starred as David Clark, a drug dealer, in We're the Millers (2013), alongside Jennifer Aniston, Emma Roberts and Will Poulter. He reprised his role of Kurt Buckman in Horrible Bosses 2 (2014).

2015–present
Sudeikis starred as Jake in the romantic-comedy film Sleeping with Other People (2015). He starred alongside Rebecca Hall in the romantic-drama film Tumbledown (2015).

Sudeikis voices the character of Red in the animated-comedy film The Angry Birds Movie (2016), based on the video game series of the same name. He starred alongside Anne Hathaway in Colossal (2016). He starred in Masterminds (2016). He portrayed Larry Snyder in Race (2016), Henry in The Book of Love (2016), and Bradley in Mother's Day (2016).

From November to December 2016, Sudeikis played the lead role of John Keating in the Classic Stage Company Off-Broadway production of Dead Poets Society.

In 2017, Sudeikis executive produced the comedy series Detroiters, and appeared in two episodes.

Sudeikis starred in Kodachrome (2017), alongside Ed Harris and Elizabeth Olsen. He made appearances as Glenn in Permission (2017) and as Dave Johnson in Downsizing (2017).
 
Sudeikis starred as a side-role/reference in the Derren Brown shows Derren Brown: Secret and Derren Brown Underground, where he performed on a screen during the credits, and his name was used as a reference during the show in 2017 and 2018.

Sudeikis starred in the thriller Driven. Sudeikis voices the character of Justin Pin in the animated action comedy film Next Gen. He played Red again in the 2019 animated-comedy The Angry Birds Movie 2.

In 2019, Sudeikis appeared on the Star Wars series The Mandalorian as a Speeder Bike trooper.

Sudeikis had portrayed Ted Lasso, a hapless American football coach brought to England to coach Tottenham Hotspur F.C as part of two promotional videos for NBC Sports in 2013 and 2014. In late 2019, Sudeikis co-wrote and starred in Ted Lasso about an American football coach that gets hired to coach an English football club, AFC Richmond (fictional football club). The series was released in August 2020 to a positive reception. It has earned him a Golden Globe Award and a Screen Actors Guild Award. At the 73rd Primetime Emmy Awards, he was nominated for and won Outstanding Comedy Series and Outstanding Lead Actor in a Comedy Series, and was  nominated for Outstanding Writing for a Comedy Series. In 2021, he appeared on the Time 100 (Times annual list of the 100 most influential people in the world) and Bloomberg's 50 Most Influential list.

Charity work
Sudeikis played on basketball teams at the 2011 and 2016 NBA All-Star Celebrity Game. He and other Kansas City celebrities have hosted the Big Slick for 10 years. The event raises money for the Cancer Center at Children's Mercy Hospital. So far, the event has raised more than $6 million for the cause.

He hosted the benefit concert Thundergong! at the Uptown Theater in Kansas City, Missouri on November 3, 2018, for the charity foundation Steps of Faith which helps provide prosthetic legs and arms.

Personal life

In June 2004, Sudeikis married American screenwriter Kay Cannon after five years together. The two were on The Second City Las Vegas cast together. They separated in 2008 and divorced in February 2010.

In 2011, Sudeikis began dating American actress and filmmaker Olivia Wilde. The couple became engaged in January 2013. They have a son, born in April 2014, and a daughter, born in October 2016.  Sudeikis and Wilde ended their relationship in November 2020.

Acting credits

Film

Television

Theatre

Video games

Music videos

Awards and nominations

References

External links

 

1975 births
Living people
20th-century American comedians
20th-century American male actors
20th-century American male writers
20th-century American screenwriters
21st-century American comedians
21st-century American male actors
21st-century American male writers
21st-century American screenwriters
Actors from Fairfax, Virginia
American impressionists (entertainers)
American male film actors
American male television actors
American male video game actors
American male voice actors
American people of German descent
American people of Irish descent
American people of Lithuanian descent
American sketch comedians
American television writers
American male television writers
Best Musical or Comedy Actor Golden Globe (television) winners
Fort Scott Community College alumni
Male actors from Kansas City, Kansas
Male actors from Virginia
Outstanding Performance by a Lead Actor in a Comedy Series Primetime Emmy Award winners
Outstanding Performance by a Male Actor in a Comedy Series Screen Actors Guild Award winners
People from Overland Park, Kansas
Screenwriters from Kansas
Screenwriters from Virginia
Writers from Kansas City, Kansas